The Taça Jorge Chavéz/Santos Dumont, was a friendly football match realized between Brazil and Peru, on July 14 and 17 of 1968. The series, played in a two-legged format at Estadio Nacional in Lima, was similar to others played at the time, such as the Copa Roca.

The name of the trophy was a tribute to Jorge Chávez Dartnell and Alberto Santos-Dumont, the two Brazilian pioneers of world aviation.

Match details

First leg

Second leg

References  

Brazil national football team matches
Peru national football team matches
1968 in Brazilian football
1968 in Peruvian football
International association football competitions hosted by Peru
Defunct international association football competitions in South America